This is a list of American defunct television networks.

Distant locals/superstations

Entertainment

Family

LGBT

Lifestyle

Music

News and information

Regional news

Pay-per-view

Movies

Public-interest/educational

Religion

Shopping

Sports

Regional sports

Spanish

Ethnic

African-American

Asian

German

High-definition

Network re-brands

References 

Television networks